The 1983 1. divisjon was the 39th completed season of top division football in Norway.

Overview
22 games were played with 2 points given for wins and 1 for draws. Number eleven and twelve were relegated. The winners of the two groups of the 2. divisjon were promoted, as well as the winner of a series of play-off matches between number ten in the 1. divisjon and the two second-placed teams in the two groups of the 2. divisjon. 

Vålerengen won the championship, their third title.

Teams and locations
''Note: Table lists in alphabetical order.

League table

Results

Relegation play-offs
The qualification play-off matches were contested between Brann (10th in the 1. divisjon), Pors (2nd in the 2. divisjon - Group A), and Strindheim (2nd in the 2. divisjon - Group B). Strindheim won and were promoted to the 1. divisjon.

Results
Strindheim 0–0 Brann
Pors 1–2 Strindheim
Brann 1–1 Pors

Season statistics

Top scorer
 Olav Nysæter, Kongsvinger – 14 goals

Attendances

References

Norway - List of final tables (RSSSF)

Eliteserien seasons
Norway
Norway
1